Josh Griffin (born 9 May 1990) is an English rugby league footballer who plays as a  or er for Hull F.C. in the Betfred Super League.

He has previously played for the Wakefield Trinity Wildcats, Huddersfield Giants, Castleford Tigers (Heritage № 921) and the Salford Red Devils in the Super League. He spent time at the Batley Bulldogs, on loan from Huddersfield and also on permanent deal at Batley in the Championship. Between 2012 and 2014 he played professional rugby union as a winger for Leeds Carnegie in the RFU Championship.

Background
Griffin was born in Oxford, Oxfordshire, England.

Club career
Having joined the club as a junior, Griffin made his professional début for Wakefield Trinity Wildcats in a Challenge Cup victory against Salford on 20 April 2008. He joined Huddersfield at the end of the 2008 season.

He made his début for Huddersfield in the Challenge Cup victory over Rochdale Hornets on 11 May 2009, and made his Super League début later that year.

Griffin spent most of 2010 on loan at Batley, and rejoined Wakefield Trinity Wildcats in 2011.

He signed for Castleford in September 2011, and played for them in 2012 before leaving the club to join rugby union club; Leeds Carnegie with immediate effect at the end of the season. He returned to rugby league in 2014 with Batley.

In 2014 Griffin initially joined Salford on a trial for the end of the 2014 season before securing himself a permanent 2-year deal.

In 2017 Griffin joined Hull FC, and played in Hull's 18-14 Challenge Cup final win over the Wigan Warriors at Wembley Stadium.

In the 2020 Super League season, he made a total of 16 appearances.  

In May 2021, Griffin scored his 100th career try in a match against Leeds Rhinos. The match was Leeds' first home fixture in front of a home crowd for over 400 days as national restrictions were eased during the coronavirus pandemic.

In the 2021 Challenge Cup semi-final, Griffin ruptured his achilles during Hull FC's 33-18 loss against St Helens RLFC.

Personal life
Griffin is the younger brother of the rugby league player Darrell Griffin, and the older brother of George Griffin. All three brothers played together for Salford in 2015.

Honours

Challenge Cup: (1) 2017

References

External links

Hull F.C. profile
Salford profile
SL profile

1990 births
Living people
Batley Bulldogs players
Castleford Tigers players
English rugby league players
English rugby union players
Huddersfield Giants players
Hull F.C. players
Leeds Tykes players
Rugby league centres
Rugby league players from Oxfordshire
Rugby league wingers
Rugby union wings
Salford Red Devils players
Rugby union players from Oxford
Sportspeople from Oxford
Wakefield Trinity players